53 Camelopardalis is a binary star system in the northern circumpolar constellation of Camelopardalis, located 290 light years away from the Sun as determined by parallax measurements. It has the variable star designation AX Camelopardalis; 53 Camelopardalis is the Flamsteed designation. This object is dimly visible to the naked eye as a white hued star with a baseline apparent visual magnitude of +6.02. It is a single-lined spectroscopic binary system with an orbital period of 6.63 years and a high eccentricity of 0.718.

The visible component is a well-studied magnetic Ap star with a stellar classification of A3VpSrSiCrEu and a visual magnitude of 6.3. The magnetic field topology of 53 Camelopardalis is complex, and is accompanied by abundance variations across the surface of elements like silicon, calcium, titanium, iron, and neodymium. It is classified as an Alpha2 Canum Venaticorum type variable star and the combined brightness of the system varies from magnitude +6.00 down to +6.05 with a rotationally-modulated period of 8.0278 days.

The primary has 2.1 times the mass of the Sun and 2.4 times the Sun's radius. It is spinning with a projected rotational velocity of 12.5 km/s and a rotation period of 8.0268 days. The inclination angle of the pole is estimated to be . The star is about 615 million years old and is radiating 25 times the luminosity of the Sun from its photosphere at an effective temperature of 8,400 K.

References

A-type main-sequence stars
Ap stars
Alpha2 Canum Venaticorum variables
Spectroscopic binaries
Camelopardalis (constellation)
Durchmusterung objects
Camelopardalis, 53
065339
039261
3109
Camelopardalis, AX